Sha Menghai (June 11, 1900 – October 10, 1992), born Shi Wenruo (沙文若), was a great master of calligraphy in China.  He also was a master of Chinese seal carving (中国篆刻艺术), a theoretician of traditional Chinese art, and a master of Shanghai School art. Sha Wenhan is his brother.

Sha was born in Sha village in Yinxian, Zhejiang. He was a professor in National Zhongshan University (from 1929), National Zhejiang University (from 1949),  and China Academy of Art (from 1963).

References

Zhu, Guantian, "Sha Menghai". Encyclopedia of China, 1st ed.

External links

People's Republic of China calligraphers
1900 births
1992 deaths
Chinese seal artists
Artists from Ningbo
Academic staff of Zhejiang University
China Academy of Art
Republic of China calligraphers
Chinese art historians
Writers from Ningbo
Educators from Ningbo
20th-century Chinese historians
Historians from Zhejiang